Ptiloglossa mexicana is a species of nocturnal bee in the family Colletidae. It is found from Central America north to Texas.

References

Further reading

 

Colletidae
Articles created by Qbugbot
Insects described in 1878